The men's 110 metres hurdles at the 2018 Commonwealth Games, as part of the athletics programme, took place in the Carrara Stadium on 9 and 10 April 2018.

Ronald Levy's victory was his first international podium finish, as he held off his more decorated compatriot Hansle Parchment to succeed Andrew Riley (another Jamaica) as the Commonwealth Games champion. Andrew Pozzi – 2018 world indoor champion and the fastest qualifier in the first round – struggled after striking the first hurdle in the final and finished sixth.

Records
Prior to this competition, the existing world and Games records were as follows:

Schedule
The schedule was as follows:

All times are Australian Eastern Standard Time (UTC+10)

Results

First round
The first round consisted of two heats. The three fastest competitors per heat (plus two fastest losers) advanced to the final.

Heat 1

Heat 2

Final
The medals were determined in the final.

References

Men's 110 metres hurdles
2018